The 1926 Calgary municipal election was held on December 15, 1926 to elect a Mayor seven Aldermen to sit on Calgary City Council. Along with positions on Calgary City Council, three trustees for the Public School Board two trustees for the Separate School Board, and a number of plebiscites were held, all requiring a two-thirds majority to pass.

Calgary City Council governed under "Initiative, Referendum and Recall" which is composed of a Mayor, Commissioner and twelve Aldermen all elected to staggered two year terms. Mayor Frederick Ernest Osborne and five Aldermen: Frank Roy Freeze, Robert Cadogan Thomas, Robert H. Parkyn, Thomas Alexander Hornibrook and Sam S. Savage elected in 1925 continued in their positions.

The 1926 election was the second incidence in Calgary history where a woman was elected to Calgary City Council, as Edith Patterson garnered 767 votes. Annie Gale was the first member of Calgary City Council elected in 1917.

Background

The election was held under the Single Transferable Voting/Proportional Representation (STV/PR) with the term for candidates being two years.

Results

Mayor

Council
Quota for election was 1,335.

Public School Board
Quota for election was 2,491.

Separate School Board
Quota for election was 202.

Plebiscites

Industries Assessment
City proposes to seek powers to grant reduced assessment from 50 to 25 per cent to new industries or extensions costing at least $25,000.

Edmonton Trail Bridge
Edmonton Trail Bridge for $23,500. Requires a two-thirds majority.

See also
List of Calgary municipal elections

References

1920s in Calgary
Municipal elections in Calgary
1926 elections in Canada